Joseph P. McGee (1902–1958) was an American football and basketball coach. He is credited with instituting basketball at Providence College in Providence, Rhode Island, where he later served as head football coach, from 1934 to 1937, compiling a record of 13–18. McGee was also the head coach of the revived Providence Steamrollers of the American Association of football.

McGee later owned a garage and car rental service as the Narraganset Hotel in Providence. He died in 1958 of a heart attack.

Head coaching record

College football

References

External links
 

1902 births
1958 deaths
American football halfbacks
Providence Friars football players
Providence Friars men's basketball coaches
Providence Friars football coaches